Arthur Henry Krawczak (February 2, 1913 – January 13, 2000) was an American Bishop of the Catholic Church. He served as an auxiliary bishop of the Archdiocese of Detroit from 1973 to 1982.

Biography
Born in Detroit, Michigan, Arthur Krawczak was ordained a priest for the Archdiocese of Detroit on May 18, 1940.  On February 8, 1973 Pope Paul VI appointed him titular Bishop of Subbar and an auxiliary bishop for Detroit.  He was consecrated by Cardinal John Dearden on April 3, 1973. The principal co-consecrators were Detroit auxiliary bishops Walter Schoenherr and Thomas Gumbleton.  Krawczak continued to serve as an auxiliary bishop until his resignation was accepted by Pope John Paul II on August 17, 1982.  He died January 13, 2000, at the age of 86.

References

1913 births
2000 deaths
Clergy from Detroit
Roman Catholic Archdiocese of Detroit
20th-century American Roman Catholic titular bishops
American people of Polish descent
Religious leaders from Michigan